The Personal Flight Sky-Bike Trike is an American powered parachute that was designed and produced by Personal Flight of Kent, Washington. Now out of production, when it was available the aircraft was supplied as a kit for amateur construction.

Design and development
A variant of the Personal Flight Sky-Bike, the Sky-Bike Trike adds a three-wheeled carriage to the Sky-Bike's seat pack, to turn the paramotor into a powered parachute. The three-wheeled frame carriage attaches in minutes, with a few ball-lock pins.

It features a  parachute-style wing, single-place accommodation, tricycle landing gear and a single  Zenoah G-25 engine in pusher configuration.

The aircraft carriage is built from a combination of bolted and welded aluminium tubing. In flight steering is accomplished via handles that actuate the canopy brakes, creating roll and yaw. The main landing gear incorporates spring rod suspension.

Specifications (Sky-Bike Trike)

References

Sky-Bike Trike
1990s United States sport aircraft
1990s United States ultralight aircraft
Single-engined pusher aircraft
Powered parachutes